The World Poker Tour bracelet is the World Poker Tour's (WPT) answer to the World Series of Poker (WSOP) bracelet.  Beginning in 1976, the WSOP started awarding bracelets to winners of WSOP events.  The WSOP bracelet has become synonymous with greatness.  "It's impossible to overstate the value of a World Series of Poker gold bracelet to anyone who takes the game seriously," stated World Series of Poker Commissioner Jeffrey Pollack during the 2006 bracelet unveiling. "It is the equivalent of winning the Stanley Cup in hockey or the Lombardi Trophy in football."  Since their introduction, a poker player's success has been measured by the number of bracelets they had won.  With the introduction of the WPT bracelet, the WPT hopes to capitalize on the prestige of winning poker bracelets.  WPT Founder, President ,and CEO, Steve Lipscomb said, "The championship bracelet has become synonymous with poker as a symbol of achievement and respect, and we are honored to continue the tradition that Benny Binion [the founder of the WSOP] began over 30 years ago."

While the event champions during the first six seasons did not initially receive bracelets, the WPT presented them with bracelets at a special event at the Bellagio in Las Vegas on April 21, 2008.  The bracelets are made from titanium and diamond by Tiffany and Company.  The HendonMob, a respected online poker site, describes the bracelet, "A diamond bracelet commissioned by Tiffany might sound nice in principle but the first pictures of them released by the WPT have not been especially well received. In fact they look a bit like a bondage accessory."

References

External links
Bracelet, Necklace, Anklet & Earring

Bracelet
Sports trophies and awards
Bracelets
Awards established in 2008